Alessandro Conforto (born 18 October 1965) is an Italian modern pentathlete. He competed in the men's individual event at the 1996 Summer Olympics.

References

1965 births
Living people
Italian male modern pentathletes
Olympic modern pentathletes of Italy
Modern pentathletes at the 1996 Summer Olympics
Sportspeople from Rome
20th-century Italian people